Lamsu Kola-ye Gharbi (also Romanized as Lamsū Kolā-ye Gharbī; also known as Lamsū Kolā) is a village in Khvosh Rud Rural District, Bandpey-ye Gharbi District, Babol County, Mazandaran Province, Iran. At the 2006 census, its population was 570, in 146 families.

References 

Populated places in Babol County